Ildikó Tordasi (née Schwarczenberger; 9 September 1951 – 13 July 2015) was a Hungarian foil fencer. She competed in the 1972, 1976 and 1980 Olympics and won four medals.

Schwarczenberger was named Hungarian Sportswoman of The Year after winning the world title in 1973. In 1976 she won another world title and an Olympics gold medal. She died on 13 July 2015 at the age of 63.

References

1951 births
2015 deaths
Hungarian female foil fencers
Fencers at the 1972 Summer Olympics
Fencers at the 1976 Summer Olympics
Fencers at the 1980 Summer Olympics
Olympic fencers of Hungary
Olympic gold medalists for Hungary
Olympic silver medalists for Hungary
Olympic bronze medalists for Hungary
Olympic medalists in fencing
Martial artists from Budapest
Medalists at the 1972 Summer Olympics
Medalists at the 1976 Summer Olympics
Medalists at the 1980 Summer Olympics
Universiade medalists in fencing
Universiade bronze medalists for Hungary
Medalists at the 1977 Summer Universiade
20th-century Hungarian women